John Carnegie, 1st Earl of Northesk (1611–1667), was a Scottish noble who supported the Royalist cause during the Wars of the Three Kingdoms.

Biography
Carnegie was the son of David Carnegie and Eupheme Wemyss, a descendant of Henry Sinclair, 3rd Lord Sinclair, and was younger brother of David Carnegie, 1st Earl of Southesk. He was born before 1611 and lived at Inglismaldie Castle.

Carnegie had already been created Earl of Ethie and Lord Lour in 1647 but relinquished those titles in exchange for the 1662 creations. It was under the title Earl of Ethie that he was fined £6,000 under Cromwell's Act of Grace.

Carnegie died on 8 January 1667.

Family
He married twice, firstly to Magdalen Haliburton (b. c. 1580–1650), daughter of Sir James Haliburton.  Secondly to Margery Maule, daughter of Andrew Maule, on 29 April 1652. With his first wife he had six children:

David Carnegie, 2nd Earl of Northesk (b. before 1627–12 December 1679)
John Carnegie (married Margaret Erskine, daughter of Sir Alexander Erskine of Dun)
Anna Carnegie (married Patrick Wood, son of Sir Henry Wood of Bonnington)
Marjorie Carnegie (married first to James Scott, son of Sir John Scott of Scotstarvit, second to John Preston of Aldrie)
Jean Carnegie (married first to Alexander Lindsay, son of the 2nd Lord Spynie, second to John Lindsay of Edzell)
Magdalene Carnegie (married William Graham of Claverhouse)

Notes

References

1667 deaths
John 01
Year of birth unknown
1611 births
Peers of Scotland created by Charles I
Members of the Parliament of Scotland 1648–1651